The 2010–11 NCAA Division III men's ice hockey season began on October 22, 2010, and concluded on March 26, 2011. This was the 38th season of Division III college ice hockey.

Regular season

Season tournaments

Standings

Note: Mini-game are not included in final standings

2011 NCAA Tournament

See also
 2010–11 NCAA Division I men's ice hockey season
 2010–11 NCAA Division II men's ice hockey season

References

External links

 
NCAA